H. Maria George Colby (George; pen names, Clinton Montague, H. M. G., and  H. Maria George; October 1, 1844 – March 29, 1910) was an American writer, newspaper editor, and social leader of the long nineteenth century. Her articles appeared in various publications, including the Housewife, Housekeeper, Housekeeper's Weekly, Christian at Work, Demorest's Monthly Magazine, Arthur's Lady's Home Magazine, The Youth's Companion, the Congregationalist, the Portland Transcript, Ladles' World, Good Cheer, The Philadelphia Press, the Chicago Ledger, the Golden Rule, the Household, Good Housekeeping and St. Nicholas Magazine. She served as fashion editor of the Household. Though she used various pen names, including "H. M. G." (in art and biographical sketches contributed to various periodicals) and "Clinton Montague", her best known literary name was her maiden name, "H. Maria George".

Early life and education
Hannah Maria George was born in Warner, New Hampshire, October 1, 1844. Her parents were Gilman C. and Nancy Badger George. 
Gilman, born in 1820, died September 12, 1894, was a son of James and Hannah (Church) George, and a descendant of James George, who settled in Haverhill, Massachusetts, in 1653. He was a captain in the state militia in 1843–44, town clerk from 1868 to 1872, and selectman from 1885 to 1888. He was master of Warner Grange, president of the Kearsarge Agricultural Association, and was the first worshipful master of Harris Lodge, No. 91, Ancient Free and Accepted Masons, of Warner. Colby was of English descent on both sides of the family and inherited literary talents from ancestors connected with Daniel Webster.

Career
While in her teens, she wrote a number of novelettes that were published in New York City and Philadelphia. Later, she wrote considerably for juvenile publications, and she was also an acknowledged authority regarding domestic topics. Her articles appeared in the Housewife, Housekeeper, Housekeeper's Weekly, Christian at Work, Demorest's Monthly Magazine, Arthur's Lady's Home Magazine, The Youth's Companion, the Congregationalist, the Portland Transcript, Ladles' World, Good Cheer, The Philadelphia Press, the Chicago Ledger, the Golden Rule, the Household, Good Housekeeping and St. Nicholas For five years, she served as fashion editor of the "Household." She used various pseudonyms, but was best known to editors and the public by her maiden name. H. Maria George. A staunch advocate of temperance and equal rights for both sexes, she furthered these through her writing.

Personal life
She married Frederick Myron Colby, the littérateur, December 24, 1882. They resided in Warner, and she died there on March 29, 1910.

Selected works

Non-fiction
 1885, "The Medieval Housewife"
 1885, "The Pets of Noted Persons"
 1885, "The Home of Juliet and Romeo"
 1888, "The City of the White Swan"
 1888, "A Notable Place"

Short stories
 1882, "Hermann the Brave"
 1905, "The Old Widow and Her Cat"

Poems
 1901, "Then we shall see"
 1906, "Bring out the flag: Memorial Day poem"

References

Bibliography

External links
 
 

1844 births
1910 deaths
19th-century American writers
19th-century American women writers
19th-century pseudonymous writers
20th-century pseudonymous writers
20th-century American writers
20th-century American women writers
Writers from New Hampshire
American women short story writers
American short story writers
People from Warner, New Hampshire
Fashion editors
American children's writers
Pseudonymous women writers
Social leaders
Women magazine editors
Wikipedia articles incorporating text from A Woman of the Century